Acronicta leucocuspis is a moth of the family Noctuidae. It is found in the Korean Peninsula,  China, Japan (Hokkaido, Honshu, Kyushu) and the Russian Far East (Primorye, southern Khabarovsk and southern Sakhalin).

External links
Korean Insects

Acronicta
Moths of Asia
Moths described in 1878